An escape plan is a plan for prison escape or from other forms of confinement.

Escape Plan may also refer to:

 Escape Plan (video game), 2012 puzzle video game
 Escape Plan (film series), an American prison action thriller film series that debuted with the film Escape Plan in 2013
 Escape Plan (film), the first film in the series
 Escape Plan 2: Hades, the sequel to the 2013 film 
 Escape Plan: The Extractors, the sequel to the 2018 film
 "Escape Plan" (song), 2021 single by American rapper Travis Scott

See also
 The Getaway Plan, a rock band from Melbourne, Australia